Luteococcus peritonei is a Gram-positive bacterium from the genus Luteococcus which has been isolated from a human peritoneum.

References 

Propionibacteriales
Bacteria described in 2000